Amédée William Merlaud-Ponty (4 February 1866 – 13 June 1915) was a French colonial administrator. He was a Governor General of French West Africa (1908–1915) who particularly interested himself in the economic development and education of Africa.

During World War I, Merlaud-Ponty was responsible for recruiting volunteers for African battlefields.

At Dakar's railway station a 1923 monument dedicated "to the creators of French West Africa and the glory of the Black army" features Paul Ducuing's statues of the tirailleur Demba and the zouave Dupont. The same monument honours the French conqueror of Senegal, Louis Faidherbe, as well as four Governors-General, Noël Ballay, Joost van Vollenhoven, François Clozel and Ponty himself.

See also
 Colonial administrators in Senegal
History of Senegal
Education in Senegal
William Ponty school
 Dakar College of Science and Veterinary Medicine
École nationale de médecine et pharmacie (Senegal)
 Georges Hardy, Une conquête morale: l'enseignement en AOF, L'Harmattan, 2005, 275 p.

Notes

1866 births
1915 deaths
People from Rochefort, Charente-Maritime
Governors of French West Africa
History of Ivory Coast
History of Senegal